The Speaker of the New York General Assembly was the highest official in the New York General Assembly, the first representative governing body in New York from 1683 to 1775 when the assembly disbanded after the outbreak of the American Revolutionary War.

As in most countries with a British heritage, the speaker presides over the lower house of the legislature and was elected from within the ranks of the General Assembly.

New York General Assembly
The New York General Assembly was first convened on October 14, 1683, during the governorship of Thomas Dongan, 2nd Earl of Limerick, which passed an act entitled "A Charter of Liberties" that decreed that the supreme legislative power under the Duke of York shall reside in a governor, council, and the people convened in general assembly; conferred upon the members of the assembly rights and privileges making them a body coequal to and independent of the British Parliament; established town, county, and general courts of justice; solemnly proclaimed the right of religious liberty; and passed acts enunciating certain constitutional liberties, e.g. taxes could be levied only by the people met in general assembly; right of suffrage; and no martial law or quartering of the soldiers without the consent of the inhabitants.

The General Assembly elected a Speaker from their own ranks, chose their own clerk, and published their own journal.

List of speakers 

The following were elected from the General Assembly to serve as Speaker of the Assembly.

See also
 List of colonial governors of New York
 New York General Assembly
 List of speakers of the New York State Assembly

References
Notes

Sources